Henry III of Louvain (German: Heinrich, Dutch:Hendrik, French: Henri; died 1095), was Count of Louvain (Leuven) and Landgrave of Brabant, son of Henry II (c. 1020–1078), Count of Louvain and Brussels, and Adela of Orthen (or Betuwe), a daughter of Count Everard of Orthen.

Life
At his father Henry's death 1078 he became Count of Louvain.

He was allied by family marriages to most of the nearby lords: he was brother-in-law of Baldwin II of Hainaut, and son-in-law of Robert I of Flanders. The bishop of Liège, Henri I of Verdun, was peace-loving. Henry was able to concentrate on the internal affairs of his lands, without external threats. He supported religious foundations in the western parts, and legislated to reduce lawlessness.

After the death on 20 September 1085 of Hermann II, count palatine of Lotharingia, he became landgrave of Brabant, which was an imperial fief between the Dender and the Zenne.

In July 1095, he took part in a tournament in Tournai. Fighting in a joust against Gosuin de Forest, he was mortally wounded.

Family

About 1090 he married Gertrude of Flanders (1080–1117), daughter of Robert I of Flanders and Gertrude of Saxony.

A genealogy of the time attributes to him four daughters (not named). Since he was succeeded by his brother Godfrey I of Leuven, it is inferred that he did not leave a son as heir. It has been suggested that the daughters included:
 Adelaide, wife of duke Simon I of Lorraine
 Gertrude, wife to Lambert, count of Montaigu and Clermont.

Gertrude of Flanders, widowed, married in 1096 duke Theodoric II of Lorraine (died 1115) and was mother of Thierry of Alsace ("Theodoric").

Ancestry

See also
Dukes of Brabant family tree
 Chronique des Ducs de Brabant, Adrian van Baerland, Antwerp (1612).

References

Counts of Louvain
Margraves of Antwerp
1095 deaths
House of Reginar
Year of birth unknown